Roee or Roei is a Hebrew male given name meaning "shepherd". Notable people with the name include:

 Roee Avraham (born 1996), Israeli squash player
 Roee Rosen (born 1963), Israeli artist

See also
 Roe (surname)

Hebrew-language given names